Phthorimaea suavella is a moth in the family Gelechiidae. It was described by Aristide Caradja in 1920. It is found in Algeria.

References

Phthorimaea
Moths described in 1920